The Sungai Kial Forest Reserve is a protected area of tropical rainforest habitat in Cameron Highlands, Pahang, Malaysia.

A camera trapping survey was carried out here in 1999, led by Wan Shaharuddin of the Department of Wildlife and National Parks (as part of the Tiger Research Unit) and discovered a range of species including the marbled cat, leopard cat, asian golden cat, muntjac, malay civet, masked palm civet, common porcupine, brush-tailed porcupine, pangolin, sun bear, wild boar, banded linsang, short-tailed macaque (probably meaning the pig-tailed macaque) and wild dog (probably dhole). Despite being connected to the larger Cameron Highlands forest complex there were no tigers detected, which could be due to the relatively low sampling effort (just 575 camera trap nights).

References 

Cameron Highlands
Protected areas of Malaysia
Forest reserves of Malaysia
Geography of Pahang